Pyhäsalmi Airfield is an airfield in Pyhäjärvi, Finland.

See also
List of airports in Finland

References

External links
 VFR Suomi/Finland – Pyhäsalmi Airfield
 Lentopaikat.net – Pyhäsalmi Airfield 

Airports in Finland
Airfield
Buildings and structures in North Ostrobothnia